The Lawrence Opera House is a historic two-story building in Lawrence, Nebraska. It was built in 1901. For D. Layne Ehlers, "[t]his opera house is significant in the area of social history, because it gave Lawrence a neutral, nonaffiliated location for lodge meetings, suppers, and school entertainments." The building has been listed on the National Register of Historic Places since September 28, 1988.

References

National Register of Historic Places in Nuckolls County, Nebraska
Commercial buildings completed in 1901
1901 establishments in Nebraska